England was included in a set of special commemorative postage stamps issued by the Royal Mail in 2006 to celebrate the component nations in the United Kingdom. The stamps featuring England were the final part of the British Journey series, which had previously featured Scotland, Northern Ireland, and Wales.  They were available as mint stamps, as a presentation pack, stamps cards, and a first day cover.

British Journey series
These stamps were the final issue in the British Journey series; which started in 2003 with Scotland, followed in 2004 with Northern Ireland and Wales, and South West England in 2005. The series was brought to a premature end with this issue due to a lack of popularity amongst collectors.

Stamp details
The stamps were issued as a block of stamps, five wide by two deep. The photographs selected for this issue show no sky but are intended to demonstrate the colours and textures of the United Kingdom. All values are first class.

Photos
 Carding Mill Valley, Shropshire
 Beachy Head, Sussex
 St Paul's Cathedral, London
 Brancaster on the Norfolk coast
 Derwent Edge in Derbyshire's Peak District
 Robin Hood's Bay, Yorkshire
 Buttermere in the Lake District
 Chipping Campden in the Gloucestershire Cotswold hills
 St Boniface Down, Isle of Wight
 Chamberlain Square, Birmingham

Details
 Designed by Phelan Barker Design
 Stamp Size 35mm x 35mm (Square)
 Printed by De La Rue Security Print
 Print Process Photogravure
 Perforations 14.5 x 14.5
 Gum PVA

Presentation pack
The presentation pack was written by Simon Calder, travel editor of the Independent newspaper. He also wrote the pack for the airliners issue.

See also
List of British postage stamps
List of postage stamps

References

Postage stamps of the United Kingdom
England (British Postage Stamps)